Rocio Maldonado (born 1951) is a Mexican artist.

She has several works in the permanent collection of New York's Museum of Modern Art (MoMA).

References

Living people
1951 births
Mexican artists
Place of birth missing (living people)